Parque del Recuerdo (Spanish for "Memory Park") may refer to:

 Parque del Recuerdo (Chile), a group of cemetery parks in Santiago
 Parque del Recuerdo (Uruguay), a private cemetery east of downtown Montevideo in Canelones Department

See also
 Parque del Reencuentro, north of downtown Montevideo in Canelones Department, Uruguay
 Remembrance park, Buenos Aires, Argentina